Sabina is a Protected Designation of Origin (PDO) that applies to the extra virgin olive oil produced in the Sabina region. This area approximately covers the territory originally occupied by the ancient Sabines tribe in the Province of Rome and the Province of Rieti. It is considered to be the first Italian PDO to gain the status, later being followed by Aprutino Pescarese, Brisighella, Collina di Brindisi and Canino.

Production area: Sabina 

The production area of the PDO extra virgin olive oil is mainly in two provinces, Rieti and Rome, and follows the borders of the ancient Sabine territory. Techniques used to produce the oil are almost the same as in pre-Roman times with necessary technological innovations. For the production of the extra virgin olive oil Sabina, the soil and the mild climate are of fundamental importance.

Municipalities in the Province of Rieti 

The following municipalities within the Province of Rieti are areas of production of Sabina: 
Cantalupo in Sabina, Casaprota, Casperia, Castelnuovo di Farfa, Collevecchio, Configni, Cottanello, Fara Sabina, Forano, Frasso Sabino, Magliano Sabina, Mompeo, Montasola, Montebuono, Monteleone Sabino, Montenero Sabino,
Montopoli in Sabina, Poggio Catino, Poggio Mirteto, Poggio Moiano, Poggio Nativo, Poggio San Lorenzo, Roccantica, Salisano, Scandriglia, Selci, Stimigliano, Tarano, Toffia, Torricella, Torri in Sabina, Vacone.

Municipalities in the Province of Rome 

In the Province of Rome:
Guidonia Montecelio, Fonte Nuova, Marcellina, Mentana, Monteflavio, Montelibretti, Monterotondo, Montorio Romano, Moricone, Nerola, Palombara Sabina, Sant'Angelo Romano, San Polo dei Cavalieri (località Caprareccia e territorio non oltre i 475 metri di altitudine), Roma (parzialmente il territorio del Nord-Est).

Cultivar and organoleptic traits

Cultivar 

The characterizing cultivar are:
 Carboncella
 Leccino
 Raja
 
 Frantoio
 Moraiolo
 Olivastrone
 Salviana
 Olivago and Rosciola

Organoleptic traits 

Organoleptic traits:
 color: yellow - green with golden nuances.
 aroma: fruity;
 taste: fruity, velvet, uniform, aromatic, sweet, bitter and piquant for the just  pressed oils;
 panel test: median in fruity > 0 e median of defect = 0;
 maximum acidity in total expressed in oleic acid, in weight, not exceeding grams 0,6 per 100 grams of oil;
 number of peroxides 14 Meq0 2 /kg.;
 minimum oleic acid 68%.

See also

Appellation
Country of origin
European Union Common Agricultural Policy
Genericized trademark
Geographical indication
Italian cuisine
Italian wines
List of geographical designations for spirit drinks in the European Union
List of Italian cheeses
List of Italian DOC wines
List of Italian DOCG wines
List of Italian products with protected designation of origin
Olive oil regulation and adulteration
Olive oil
Protected Geographical Status
Quality Wines Produced in Specified Regions (QWPSR)

References

External links
 Sabina D.O.P.
 Strada dell'olio Sabina
 Lazio Region, Agriculture
 Lazio Region, Tourism

Italian products with protected designation of origin
Olive oil